Abirami  is a 2010 Indian-Tamil-language soap opera starring Gautami, K.K, Shanthi Williams, Vietnam Veedu Sundaram and Kalpana. It aired Monday through Thursday 9:30PM (IST) on Kalaignar TV from 18 January 2010 through 30 December 2010 for 198 episodes. Actress Gautami player Abirami, Nandha and Saranya and the show was directed by Mathivanan, with the creative head being Kutty Padmini.

From 13 July 2015 the show was relaunched on Kalaignar TV and aired Monday through Friday at 18:30 (IST). Starting from Monday, 2 November 2015, the show was shifted to the 20:00 (IST) time slot. Starting from Monday 4 January 2016, the show was shifted to the 21:30 (IST) time slot.

Plot
Abirami (Gautami) plays the protagonist, where she is a brave, bold and a beautiful woman who is typically a very straightforward person. She is against social injustice in society, and to women in particular. The serial features her fight against injustice, and her strategy in this fight.

Cast
 Gautami as Abirami, Saranya and Nandha
 Krishna Kumar as Abhirami's husband
Jayakrishnan
 Shyam as Saranya's husband
 Vietnam Veedu Sundaram
 Kalpana
 Shanthi Williams
Gopi as Gopi 
Sathya Sai as Viji 
Ravi Raj as Subramani  
 Krishnakumar
 Lakshmi
 Bhavani
 Saimantha
 Y. Vijaya
 Rajapriya as Anandhakalyani
 Rajasekar
 Manohar
 Sridhar
 Sivakavitha
 Kumareshan
 Arya Nepal
 My Dear Bootham Abhilash
 Harish
 Madhan Sundar

Launching
The show was launching in Abhirami Mega Mall in Chennai. Tamil Film Actor Kamal Haasan was the chief guest at the event. Others present were the Producer's Council president Rama Narayanan, FEFSI chief VC Guhanathan, the Small Screen Actors' Association president Khushbu and Abirami Ramanathan.

Original soundtrack

Title song
It was written by the lyricist Na. Muthukumar and composed by the music director Mariya Manohar.

Soundtrack

Airing history 
The show started airing on Kalaignar TV on 18 January 2010 and It aired on Monday through Thursday 21:30 (IST). The channel started repeat aired from Monday 2 November 2015, the show was shifted to 20:00 (IST) time Slot. Starting from Monday 4 January 2016, the show was shifted to 21:30 (IST) time Slot.

Awards

International broadcast
The Series was released on 18 January 2010 on Kalaignar TV. The Show was also broadcast internationally on Channel's international distribution. It aired in Sri Lanka, Singapore, Malaysia, South East Asia, Middle East, Oceania, South Africa and Sub Saharan Africa on Kalaignar TV and also aired in United States, Canada, Europe on Kalaignar Ayngaran TV. The show's episodes were released on Kalaignar TV YouTube channel.

References

External links
 

Kalaignar TV television series
2010 Tamil-language television series debuts
2010 Tamil-language television series endings
2010s Tamil-language television series
Tamil-language television shows
2015 Tamil-language television series debuts
2016 Tamil-language television series endings